The 2002 Hammersmith and Fulham Council election took place on 2 May 2002 to elect members of Hammersmith and Fulham London Borough Council in London, England. The whole council was up for election and the Labour party stayed in overall control of the council, despite winning fewer votes than the Conservative party.

Background
This was the first set of council election using new ward boundaries - a majority of which were three seaters.  The total number of council seats was reduced from 50 to 46.

Election result
The Labour Party won 28 seats (on a 41.0% share of the vote) - 8 fewer seats than at previous election (on a loss of 8.7% of the vote), and maintained control of the council.
The Conservative Party won 18 seats (with 42.5% of the vote) - 4 more seats than their previous result (increasing their vote share by 4.9%)
The Liberal Democrats did not win any seats, and polled 14.1% of the votes cast - an increase of 1.5%.

Ward results

Addison

Askew

Avonmore and Brook Green

College Park and Old Oak

Fulham Broadway

Fulham Reach

Hammersmith Broadway

Munster

North End

Palace Riverside

Parsons Green and Walham

Ravenscourt Park

Sands End

Shepherds Bush Green

Town

Wormholt and White City

References

2002
2002 London Borough council elections
21st century in the London Borough of Hammersmith and Fulham